The ABU TV Song Festival 2020 was the ninth annual edition of the ABU TV Song Festivals.

History
The event, which is non-competitive, took place in the capital city of Kuala Lumpur, Malaysia, coinciding with the 57th General Assembly of the Asia-Pacific Broadcasting Union (ABU).

Originally, the Vietnamese city of Hanoi was chosen to host the contest for the second time after 2013, but withdrew their intention to host the show in August 2020.

List of participants
A total of fourteen countries took part in the ABU TV Song Festival 2020. Nepal and Vanuatu made their debut in the event, with Brunei, Turkmenistan, Uzbekistan and host country Malaysia returning. Australia, Hong Kong and Kazakhstan withdrew from the festival.

See also 
 ABU TV Song Festival
 Asia-Pacific Broadcasting Union
 Eurovision Song Contest 2020
 Junior Eurovision Song Contest 2020

References

External links
 

ABU Song Festivals
2020 song contests